The Rothschild Hospital, named after its founder Baron Anselm von Rothschild, was the hospital of the Israelitische Kultusgemeinde in Vienna, Austria. The hospital lasted from its opening in 1873 until its closure by the Nazis in 1943. After World War II, it served as a hospital for sick and infirm displaced persons, housing as many as 600 refugees.

The building on Währinger Gürtel 97, built by the architect Wilhelm Stiassny, was demolished in 1960 and replaced by a new building which houses a chamber of commerce.

Hospitals established in 1873
Jews and Judaism in Vienna

Displaced persons camps in the aftermath of World War II